, also known as Doctor for Monster Girls, is a Japanese light novel series written by Yoshino Origuchi and illustrated by Z-Ton. Shueisha published ten volumes of the series under their Dash X Bunko imprint. Seven Seas Entertainment has licensed the light novel series in English for North America. A manga adaptation by Tetsumaki Tomasu began serialization online in Tokuma Shoten's Comic Ryū Web magazine in February 2018. A second manga adaptation titled Monster Girl Doctor 0 began serialization in Shueisha's Suiyōbi wa Mattari Dash X Comic in July 2020. An anime television series adaptation by Arvo Animation aired from July to September 2020.

Premise
Taking place after a long war between humans and monsters ended, the story focuses on the human Dr. Glenn Litbeit and his lamia assistant, Saphentite "Sapphee" Neikes, as they run a clinic in the city of Lindworm, which is home to many species of monsters living alongside humans.

Characters

 
Glenn is a human male from a merchant family from the far east, who specialized in medicines during the war. He strives to become a doctor for the monster population of the city of Lindworm. His calm demeanor and quick mind and focus allows him to treat everyone from a harpy girl to an immortal dragon. This tends to make him have a cadre of girls vying for his affection, much to the annoyance of Sapphee. It is implied he reciprocates Sapphee's affections, but cannot act on it until his clinic is paid off. 

Glenn's childhood friend and assistant in the clinic who goes by the nickname of "Sapphee". She organizes the clinic and monitors the fairies that assist them. She is a rare albino lamia so she has to wear a special outfit whenever she goes out into the sunlight. Her family were also merchants during the war, allying with the Litbeit family to aid the wounded and ensure medicine production on both sides. She was sent to the Litbeits as a political hostage where she met Glenn and fell in love with him. However, her family are also well known assassins and if the Litbeits were to betray them, she was set to kill Glenn's family. She also has a low tolerance for alcohol.

A centaur who is the sole heiress of Scythia Transportation. A high ranked arena fighter, she was on a losing streak until Glenn realized her problem and was able to help her by giving her horseshoes. She is very open about her infatuation for Glenn and is not afraid to say so in public, mostly to annoy Sapphee, who she considers to be a friend and romantic rival.

 A mermaid who sings at the Merrow Waterways. She does this in order to provide financial support for her family. Even while suffering from inflammation of her gills due to staying above and out of water too much, she continued singing. She saved a boy from drowning and Glenn saves her from drowning due to her gills. She develops feelings for Glenn after he saved her and treated the inflammation. 

An arachne who is a fashion designer, by sewing clothes with her own silk. She is a friend of Sapphee and has known her for a long time and has made several of her sunblocking outfits due to arachne silk being very durable. Her skill is so good, she can do minute stitchwork swiftly and efficiently. She tries to seduce Glenn originally to get a response from Sapphee and Tisalia, but soon realizes that she has fallen for him herself.

The chairwoman and head council representative of Lindworm. She was the dragon that was able to bring the humans and monsters together before they could destroy each other completely, bringing an end to the war and founding the city as an experiment to see if monsters and humans can co-exist. She is hundreds of years old, yet has the body of a young girl. She dresses head to toe in robes and a veil so few have seen her face, but they are used to hide a parasitic condition. Due to said condition, she rarely speaks above a whisper so her words are relayed by Kunai. 

The personal assistant and bodyguard to Lady Skadi. A rare flesh golem from the east, she was taken in by Skadi and becomes entirely devoted to her and takes her job seriously. However, due to her nature, she has been known to lose parts if she is damaged. Due to how she was created, she is not fond of doctors and she can hear the voices of those of the body parts she is created from. While she is very proud of her warrior nature, her heart is that of a pure maiden who develops feelings for Glenn after he helps repair her during a mission. Now she goes to him whenever she needs to replace her stitches or parts, because as he helps her, the voices are a lot quieter. 

A harpy who was captured by bandits and forced to lay eggs to be sold. However, she had an impacted egg from stress until Glenn helped her while Skadi and Sapphee held off the remaining bandits. Afterward, she and the others went to a nearby harpy village to live. 

A cyclops who works at the Kuklo Workshop. She has issues due to dry eye because hers is larger than the others. However, it gives her more clarity in very fine work such as detailing and making surgical instruments like scalpels and needles that the hospital and Glenn use. She was inspired by Skadi to try to make things people could use to live. She also likes wearing Gothic Lolita outfits created by Arahnia. While she seems to have feelings for Glenn, she often feels embarrassed when she get closer to him.

A centaur who is one of Tisalia's attendants. She was a war orphan who was adopted by the Arte family, servants of the Scythia family.

A centaur who is one of Tisalia's attendants. Like Kay, Lorna was a war orphan who was adopted by the Arte family. Due to her being more sensitive than Tisalia and Kay, she suffers from self-esteem issues and needs a more controlling hand than Kay. She is unknowingly into binding, which actually calms her down.

A rare gigas who lives near the harpy village and sees Glenn for a head cold while he was performing examinations at the village. Due to her size, she moves very slowly and carefully so not to injure any smaller creatures, but every step causes earthquakes and landslides. Though young for her race, she still is hundreds of years old and has known Cthulhy and Skadi for a long time. She is friends with Illy, who goes to her mountaintop to visit her. 

A Scylla who is the head medical doctor of the Lindworm Central Hospital. Cthulhy is the mentor and primary teacher of Glenn and Sapphee who had them start the clinic to expand their learning of medicine and to groom Glenn to take over for her one day. She has known Skadi for a long time, hinting she is hundreds of years old despite looking like she is in her 30s. She enjoys openly flirting with Glenn, much to the annoyance of Sapphee.

An alraune who is a member of the city council. Second-in-command to Skadi, she is in charge of agriculture.

The former shoggoth that was attached to Skadi. Once collected, she joined the skeleton of the former supervisor of the dead district and is working to make it a tourist attraction with the help of the undead residents. She uses a shovel as a weapon in order to keep the more unruly monsters in line. She is also highly interested in Glenn, more as a lover than a mate. 

Glenn's sister from the east who suffers from Demonitis. She began sprouting horns from her forehead, which proves her family has more than just human blood in their ancestry, which lead her to overheating if she becomes flustered or overexerts herself until Glenn was able to help her. She currently works in the red light district as a patrol member. She considers Sapphee as her sister, and is friends with Memé and Arahnia. Due to all the women flocking to Glenn, she takes it upon herself, by orders of her mother, to find Glenn the most suitable to be his wife.

Media

Light novel
The Monster Girl Doctor light novel series is written by Yoshino Origuchi and illustrated by Z-Ton, who is one of the artists featured in the Monster Musume: I ♥ Monster Girls manga anthology. Shueisha published ten volumes of the series under their Dash X Bunko imprint from June 24, 2016 to March 25, 2022. Seven Seas Entertainment licensed the series for its North American distribution, and the first volume was released on December 19, 2017.

Manga
A manga adaptation is illustrated by Tetsumaki Tomasu and has been serialized online in Tokuma Shoten's Comic Ryū Web magazine since February 26, 2018. It has been collected in two tankōbon volumes as of March 2020.

Volume list

Monster Girl Doctor

Monster Girl Doctor 0

Anime
An anime television series adaptation was announced by Bandai Namco Arts on November 14, 2019. The series was animated by Arvo Animation and directed by Yoshiaki Iwasaki, with Hideki Shirane handling series composition, Hiromi Kato designing the characters, and TO-MAS composing the music. While the anime had an advanced streaming debut on the d Anime Store on July 4, 2020, the series officially aired from July 12 to September 27, 2020 on Tokyo MX and other channels. The opening theme is  performed by ARCANA PROJECT, while the ending theme is  performed by Aina Suzuki.

The series is licensed by Crunchyroll in North America. In Southeast Asia and South Asia, the series is licensed by Muse Communication and released on Muse Asia YouTube channel and streaming service iQIYI in Southeaat Asia. On August 11, 2020, Crunchyroll announced that the series would receive an English dub, which premiered on August 16.

On May 18, 2021, it was announced Sentai Filmworks picked up the home video rights.

See also
 Nurse Hitomi's Monster Infirmary, a manga series with a similar premise

Notes

References

External links
  
  
 

2016 Japanese novels
Animated television series about monsters
Anime and manga based on light novels
Arvo Animation
Classical mythology in anime and manga
Comedy anime and manga
Crunchyroll anime
Dash X Bunko
Fantasy anime and manga
Harem anime and manga
Japanese webcomics
Legendary creatures in popular culture
Light novels
Muse Communication
Seinen manga
Sentai Filmworks
Seven Seas Entertainment titles
Shueisha books
Shueisha manga
Television series based on classical mythology
Television shows based on light novels
Tokuma Shoten manga
Tokyo MX original programming
Webcomics in print